Howiri ("gray projecting-point") is a Tewa Pueblo ancestral site in Taos County, New Mexico, United States. Its ten circular kivas are located on the east bank of Rio Ojo Caliente, near Homayo.  It was occupied from around 1400 until around 1525.  In 1983, it was listed on the National Register of Historic Places listings in Taos County, New Mexico.

References

Archaeological sites on the National Register of Historic Places in New Mexico
Former populated places in New Mexico
History of Taos County, New Mexico
Native American history of New Mexico
Protected areas of Taos County, New Mexico
Pueblo great houses
Puebloan buildings and structures
Ruins in the United States
Tewa
National Register of Historic Places in Taos County, New Mexico
Pueblos on the National Register of Historic Places in New Mexico
Populated places on the National Register of Historic Places in New Mexico